Elektrosila is a station of the Saint Petersburg Metro. Opened on 29 April 1961.

Saint Petersburg Metro stations
Railway stations in Russia opened in 1961
1961 establishments in the Soviet Union
Railway stations located underground in Russia